Billoo Badshah  is a 1989 Indian drama film directed by Sisir Mishra. It stars Govinda, Shatrughan Sinha, Neelam and Anita Raj. It was produced by Shatrughan Sinha's elder brother Lakhan Sinha.

Plot
Billu, an orphan, makes sacrifices for the family who helped him when he was alone. Things change when the same family humiliates Billu.

Cast
Shatrughan Sinha - Billu 
Govinda as Vijay
Neelam
Anita Raj as Asha
Sumeet Saigal as Ravi
Archana Joglekar as Nisha
Rohini Hattangadi as Billoo's mother
Sudhir Dalvi as Shankarlal, Billoo's father
Ashalata Wabgaonkar as Sumitra, Vijay's mother
Harish Patel as Tikdamdas
Kader Khan as Than-Than Tiwari
Gulshan Grover as Munna Tiwari
Goga Kapoor as Ramchabile Tiwari
Mac Mohan as Abdul
Yunus Parvez as Rickshaw Owner
Shubha Khote
Ramna Wadhawan as Ganga Devi

Music
"Jawan Jawan Ishq Jawan Hai" - Govinda
"Pyar Karenge Abhi Karenge" - Kumar Sanu, Kavita Krishnamurthy
"Ladka Razi Ladki Razi" - Kumar Sanu
"Yeh Jo Ghar Aangan Hai" - Vinod Sehgal, Dilraj Kaur
"Yeh Jo Ghar Aangan Hai (sad)" - Jagjit Singh

References

External links
 

1980s Hindi-language films
Indian drama films
Films scored by Jagjit Singh